Herbert Butler Graffis (May 31, 1893 – February 13, 1989) was an American golf writer and administrator. In recognition of his efforts to promote the sport, he was elected to the World Golf Hall of Fame in 1977.

Life and career
Graffis was born in Logansport, Indiana, on May 31, 1893. He wrote for the Chicago Sun-Times and founded the magazines Chicago Golfer, Golfdom, and Golfing. He collaborated with Tommy Armour on three instructional books and in 1975 he published a history of the PGA of America.

Founder of golf organizations
Graffis was also founder of a number of golf organizations: the National Golf Foundation, the Golf Writers Association of America, the Golf Course Superintendents Association, the Club Managers Association. He published the first U.S. Open program in 1928 and held various official positions with the PGA of America and the United States Golf Association, including the presidency of National Golf Day.

Death and legacy
He died in Fort Myers, Florida, on February 13, 1989, aged 95. He was elected to the World Golf Hall of Fame in 1977.

References

External links

Sportswriters from Illinois
Golf administrators
Golf writers and broadcasters
World Golf Hall of Fame inductees
Writers from Chicago
People from Logansport, Indiana
1893 births
1989 deaths